At the 1980 Summer Olympics in Moscow, eight events in fencing were contested. Men competed in both individual and team events for each of the three weapon types (épée, foil and sabre), but women competed only in foil events. They were held between July 22 and July 31 at the fencing hall of the Sports Complex of the Central Sports Club of the Army (north-western part of Moscow).

Medal summary

Men's events

Women's events

Medal table

Participating nations
A total of 182 fencers (133 men and 49 women) from 20 nations competed at the Moscow Games:

References

External links
Official Olympic Report

 
1980 Summer Olympics events
1980
1980 in fencing
International fencing competitions hosted by Russia
Fencing in the Soviet Union